Pediasia roesleri is a moth in the family Crambidae. It was described by Stanisław Błeszyński in 1969. It is found in the Punjab of what is now Pakistan and India.

References

Crambini
Moths described in 1969
Moths of Asia